Johann Friedrich Wilhelm Adolf von Baeyer (31 October 1835 – 20 August 1917) was a German chemist who synthesised indigo and developed a nomenclature for cyclic compounds (that was subsequently extended and adopted as part of the IUPAC organic nomenclature). He was ennobled in the Kingdom of Bavaria in 1885 and was the 1905 recipient of the Nobel Prize in Chemistry.

Family and education

Baeyer was born in Berlin as the son of the noted geodesist and captain of the Royal Prussian Army Johann Jacob Baeyer and his wife Eugenie Baeyer née Hitzig (1807–1843). Both his parents were Lutherans at the time of his birth and he was raised in the Lutheran religion. His mother was the daughter of Julius Eduard Hitzig and a member of the originally Jewish Itzig family, and had converted to Christianity before marrying his father, who was of non-Jewish German descent. Baeyer had four sisters: Clara (born 1826) Emma (born 1831), Johanna (Jeanette) (born 1839), Adelaide (died 1843) and two brothers: Georg (born 1829) and Edward (born 1832). Baeyer lost his mother at a young age while she was giving birth to his sister Adelaide.

Although his birth name was Johann Friedrich Wilhelm Adolf Baeyer, he was known simply as "Adolf Baeyer", throughout most of his life. The poet Adelbert von Chamisso and the astronomer Friedrich Wilhelm Bessel were his godparents. On his 50th birthday he was raised to the hereditary nobility by King Ludwig II of Bavaria, conferring on him the "von" distinction.

Baeyer became interested in science early, performing experiments on plant nutrition at his paternal grandfather's Müggelsheim farm as a boy. In Berlin he began chemical experimentation at the age of nine. Three years later, he synthesized a previously unknown chemical compound -double carbonate of copper and sodium. On his 13th birthday, he initiated his lifework, buying a chunk of indigo worth two Thalers for his first dye experiments.

When a schoolboy, his chemistry teacher at the Friedrich Wilhelm Gymnasium appointed him as his assistant. After graduating from secondary school in 1853, he entered the Berlin University to study physics and mathematics. A stint in the Prussian army interrupted his study until 1856, when he returned to academia at the University of Heidelberg, intending to study chemistry under Robert Bunsen.  After an argument with the renowned chemist he changed his mentor to August Kekulé. He continued to collaborate with Kekulé even after he returned to Berlin in 1858 for the completion of his doctorate on arsenic methyl chloride, or cacodylic chloride.

Academic career and achievements
After completing his doctorate, he followed Kekulé to the University of Ghent, when Kekulé became professor there. In 1875, he succeeded Justus von Liebig as Chemistry Professor at the University of Munich.

Baeyer's chief achievements include the synthesis and description of the plant dye indigo, the discovery of the phthalein dyes, and the investigation of polyacetylenes, oxonium salts, nitroso compounds (1869) and uric acid derivatives (1860 and onwards) (including the discovery of barbituric acid (1864), the parent compound of the barbiturates). He was the first to propose the correct formula for indole in 1869, after publishing the first synthesis three years earlier. His contributions to theoretical chemistry include the 'strain' (Spannung) theory of triple bonds and strain theory in small carbon rings.

In 1871 he discovered the synthesis of phenolphthalein by condensation of phthalic anhydride with two equivalents of phenol under acidic conditions (hence the name). That same year he was the first to obtain synthetic fluorescein, a fluorophore pigment which is similar to naturally occurring pyoverdin that is synthesised by microorganisms (e.g., by some fluorescent strains of Pseudomonas). Baeyer named his finding "resorcinphthalein" as he had synthesised it from phthalic anhydride and resorcinol. The term fluorescein would not start to be used until 1878.

In 1872 he experimented with phenol and formaldehyde; the resinous product was a precursor for Leo Baekeland's later commercialization of Bakelite.

In 1881 the Royal Society of London awarded Baeyer the Davy Medal for his work with indigo. He was elected a Foreign Honorary Member of the American Academy of Arts and Sciences in 1884. In 1905 he was awarded the Nobel Prize in Chemistry "in recognition of his services in the advancement of organic chemistry and the chemical industry, through his work on organic dyes and hydroaromatic compounds", and he continued in full active work as one of the best-known teachers in the world of organic chemistry up to within a year of his death.

Honours 
 1881: Davy Medal of the Royal Society in London
 1884: American Academy of Arts and Sciences fellow.
 1884: Prussian Academy of Sciences
 1885: foreign member of the Royal Society.
 1885: survey in the hereditary nobility of the Kingdom of Bavaria
 1895: admission into the Order Pour le Mérite for Sciences and Arts
 1903: Liebig Medal, awarded by the German Chemical Society
 1905: Nobel Prize in Chemistry
The  has been awarded annually since 1911.

His name is reflected in various "name reactions" as the Baeyer–Villiger oxidation and Baeyer's reagent. There is also the Von Baeyer nomenclature in structural chemistry and Baeyer strain theory (which granted him the Nobel prize) of alicyclic compounds.

In 2009 von Baeyer lunar crater was named after him.

Personal life 

He died on 20 August 1917 in Starnberg at the age of 81.

See also
Antimanic drugs
Barbituric acid
Hydantoin
Indole
Nitrosobenzene
Phenolphthalein
Picoline
Resorcinarene

References

External links

Speech given by Anders Lindstedt, President of the Royal Swedish Academy of Sciences, on December 10, 1905, upon Baeyer's receiving the Nobel Prize

1835 births
1917 deaths
19th-century German chemists
20th-century German chemists
Scientists from Berlin
German people of Jewish descent
German Nobel laureates
Nobel laureates in Chemistry
Organic chemists
Heidelberg University alumni
Humboldt University of Berlin alumni
Ludwig Maximilian University of Munich alumni
Academic staff of the Technical University of Berlin
Academic staff of the University of Strasbourg
Foreign Members of the Royal Society
Members of the Lincean Academy
Fellows of the American Academy of Arts and Sciences
Foreign associates of the National Academy of Sciences
Recipients of the Pour le Mérite (civil class)
German Lutherans
Members of the Göttingen Academy of Sciences and Humanities